Fry's Chocolate Cream is a chocolate bar developed by J. S. Fry & Sons and currently manufactured by Cadbury. Launched in 1866, Fry's Chocolate Cream is the first mass-produced chocolate bar and is the world's oldest chocolate bar brand. The original chocolate bar consisted of a plain fondant centre enrobed in plain chocolate. Variants include Peppermint Cream, Orange Cream, Raspberry Cream and Strawberry Cream.

History
Fry's Chocolate Cream was first produced in 1866 and is considered the direct descendant of Fry's Cream Stick produced in 1853. The Cream Stick was the first industrialised and affordable chocolate bar. In 1875, Fry's Chocolate Cream was remoulded to the shape it still has today. During production, it once exceeded half a million units per day and the foil wrapping and label would appear in 1925. The Orange Cream and Peppermint Cream, followed by Fry's Five Centre, were introduced in 1934.

In World War II, Bomber crews in RAF Bomber Command were regularly issued with Fry's Chocolate Creams before missions.

Products and branding

There are currently five variants of Fry's Cream:
Fry's Chocolate Cream
Fry's Peppermint Cream
Fry's Orange Cream (Discontinued 2015, relaunched 2018)
Fry's Raspberry Cream
Fry's Strawberry Cream (Relaunched 2020 Limited edition)
Over the years, other variants existed:
Fry's Five Centre (orange, raspberry, lime, strawberry, and pineapple), produced from 1934 to 1992. Five Centre was also sold with a combination of orange, coffee, vanilla, lime, and raspberry centres. It is probable that other combinations were sold at one time or another; for example, one reproduction 1950s advert shows a blackcurrant flavoured segment in place of vanilla. The Five Centre bar was renamed Fruit Medley during the 1960s, but this was later reversed.
Fry's Strawberry Cream
Fry's Pineapple Cream

An unsuccessful mid-1990s relaunch attempt also saw new variants available under the modernised "Fry's Spirit" branding for a while:
Fry's Spirit Berry Margarita
Fry's Spirit Piña Colada
Fry's Spirit Velvet Dream (cream liqueur)

Cadbury also produced a solid milk chocolate bar called Five Boys using the Fry's trademark from 1902 until 1976. Cadbury produced milk and plain chocolate sandwich bars under the Fry's branding also.

In 2021, Fry's launched a hot chocolate powder which can be blended with milk.

Lazenby commercials
In the 1960s, Fry's Chocolate Cream was advertised by model George Lazenby as 'The Big Fry' man, making him a celebrity in the UK. The commercials rivalled Cadbury Milk Tray which has been advertised by the 'Milk Tray Man'. Dyson Lowell, a casting director for James Bond, saw the Fry commercials and contacted Bond producer Harry Saltzman in the belief Lazenby could be groomed for the role of 007. Lazenby later portrayed James Bond in On Her Majesty's Secret Service, in 1969.

Location and ownership
The Fry's chocolate bar was first produced in Union Street, Bristol, England in 1866, where the family name had been associated with chocolate making since c. 1761. In 1923, Fry's (now Cadbury) chocolate factory moved to Somerdale Garden City, Keynsham, England.

Following a 2010 takeover of Cadbury plc by Kraft Foods, the Somerdale factory was closed on 31 March 2011 and its machinery shipped to Warsaw, Poland. Then, after acquisition of Cadbury by Mondelez International  production was relocated and Warsaw plant became part of Lotte Wedel.

See also

 List of chocolate bar brands

References

External links
 

British confectionery
Cadbury brands
Chocolate bars
1866 introductions
Mondelez International brands